The International Standard Classification of Education (ISCED) is a statistical framework for organizing information on education maintained by the United Nations Educational, Scientific and Cultural Organization (UNESCO). It is a member of the international family of economic and social classifications of the United Nations.

History 
The ISCED was designed in the early 1970s to serve as an instrument suitable for assembling, compiling and presenting statistics of education both within individual countries and internationally. The first version, known as ISCED 1976, was approved by the International Conference on Education (Geneva, 1975), and was subsequently endorsed by UNESCO’s 19th General Conference in 1976.

The second version, known as ISCED 1997, was approved by the UNESCO General Conference at its 29th session in November 1997 as part of efforts to increase the international comparability of education statistics. It covered primarily two cross-classification variables: levels (7) and fields of education (25). The UNESCO Institute for Statistics led the development of a third version, which was adopted by UNESCO’s 36th General Conference in November 2011 and which will replace ISCED 1997 in international data collections in the coming years. ISCED 2011 has 9 rather than 7 levels, created by dividing the tertiary pre-doctorate level into three levels. It also extended the lowest level (ISCED 0) to cover a new sub-category of early childhood educational development programmes, which target children below the age of 3 years.

During the review and revision, which led to the adoption of ISCED 2011, UNESCO Member States agreed that the fields of education should be examined in a separate process. This review is now underway with the view to establishing an independent but related classification called the ISCED Fields of Education and Training.

Related materials from the European Centre for the Development of Vocational Training and also Eurostat provide further information and statistical guidance for the classification of sub-fields of education as a companion to ISCED.

2011 version

ISCED 2011 levels, categories, and sub-categories 
Source:International Standard Classification of Education (ISCED).

 0 EARLY CHILDHOOD EDUCATION
 01 Early childhood educational development
 010 Early childhood educational development
 02 Pre-primary education
 020 Pre-primary education
 1 PRIMARY EDUCATION 
 10 Primary education
 100 Primary education
 2 LOWER SECONDARY EDUCATION
 24 General
 241 Insufficient for level completion or partial level completion, without direct access to upper secondary education
 242 Sufficient for partial level completion, without direct access to upper secondary education
 243 Sufficient for level completion, without direct access to upper secondary education
 244 Sufficient for level completion, with direct access to upper secondary education
 25 Vocational
 251 Insufficient for level completion or partial level completion, without direct access to upper secondary education
 252 Sufficient for partial level completion, without direct access to upper secondary education
 253 Sufficient for level completion, without direct access to upper secondary education
 254 Sufficient for level completion, with direct access to upper secondary education
 3 UPPER SECONDARY EDUCATION
 34 General
 341 Insufficient for level completion or partial level completion, without direct access to tertiary education
 342 Sufficient for partial level completion, without direct access to tertiary education
 343 Sufficient for level completion, without direct access to tertiary education
 344 Sufficient for level completion, with direct access to tertiary education
 35 Vocational
 351 Insufficient for level completion or partial level completion, without direct access to tertiary education
 352 Sufficient for partial level completion, without direct access to tertiary education
 353 Sufficient for level completion, without direct access to tertiary education
 354 Sufficient for level completion, with direct access to tertiary education
 4 POST-SECONDARY NON-TERTIARY EDUCATION
 44 General
 441 Insufficient for level completion, without direct access to tertiary education
 443 Sufficient for level completion, without direct access to tertiary education 
 444 Sufficient for level completion, with direct access to tertiary education
 45 Vocational
 451 Insufficient for level completion, without direct access to tertiary education
 453 Sufficient for level completion, without direct access to tertiary education 
 454 Sufficient for level completion, with direct access to tertiary education
 5 SHORT-CYCLE TERTIARY EDUCATION
 54 General
 541 Insufficient for level completion
 544 Sufficient for level completion
 55 Vocational
 551 Insufficient for level completion
 554 Sufficient for level completion 
 6 BACHELOR'S OR EQUIVALENT LEVEL
 64 Academic
 641 Insufficient for level completion
 645 First degree (3–4 years)
 646 Long first degree (more than 4 years)
 647 Second or further degree (following a bachelor's or equivalent programme)
 65 Professional
 651 Insufficient for level completion
 655 First degree (3–4 years)
 656 Long first degree (more than 4 years)
 657 Second or further degree (following a bachelor's or equivalent programme)
 66 Orientation unspecified1
 661 Insufficient for level completion
 665 First degree (3–4 years)
 666 Long first degree (more than 4 years)
 667 Second or further degree (following a bachelor's or equivalent programme)
 7 MASTER'S OR EQUIVALENT LEVEL
 74 Academic
 741 Insufficient for level completion
 746 Long first degree (at least 5 years)
 747 Second or further degree (following a bachelor's or equivalent programme)
 748 Second or further degree (following a master's or equivalent programme)
 75 Professional
 751 Insufficient for level completion
 756 Long first degree (at least 5 years)
 757 Second or further degree (following a bachelor's or equivalent programme)
 758 Second or further degree (following a master's or equivalent programme)
 76 Orientation unspecified1
 761 Insufficient for level completion
 766 Long first degree (at least 5 years)
 767 Second or further degree (following a bachelor's or equivalent programme)
 768 Second or further degree (following a master's or equivalent programme)
 8 DOCTORAL OR EQUIVALENT LEVEL
 84 Academic
 841 Insufficient for level completion
 844 Sufficient for completion of level
 85 Professional
 851 Insufficient for level completion
 854 Sufficient for completion of level
 86 Orientation unspecified
 861 Insufficient for level completion
 864 Sufficient for completion of level
 9 NOT ELSEWHERE CLASSIFIED
 99 Not elsewhere classified
 999 Not elsewhere classified

1997 version

ISCED 1997 fields of education 

 0 General programmes
 01 Basic programmes 
 08 Literacy and numeracy
 09 Personal development
 1 Education
14 Teacher training and education science
 2 Humanities and arts
 21 Arts
 22 Humanities
 3 Social sciences, business and law
 31 Social and behavioural science
 32 Journalism and information
 34 Business and administration
 38 Law
 4 Science
 42 Life sciences
 44 Physical sciences
 46 Mathematics and statistics
 48 Computing
 5 Engineering, manufacturing and construction
 52 Engineering and engineering trades
 54 Manufacturing and processing
 58 Architecture and building
 6 Agriculture
 62 Agriculture, forestry and fishery
 64 Veterinary
 7 Health and welfare
 72 Health
 76 Social services
 8 Services
 81 Personal services
 84 Transport services
 85 Environmental protection
 86 Security services
 Not known or unspecified

Comparison between versions

See also 
 European Qualifications Framework (EQF) for a similar European-based level system
 UNESCO nomenclature for fields of science and technology
 International Standard Classification of Occupations

References

External links 

 
 ISCED 2011 classification
 Roadmap to compare education systems: examples of how ISCED is applied to national education systems.
 EU Council Directive 2009/50/EC: ISCED 1997 education levels required for EU Blue Card Visa.

Works about academia
UNESCO
Educational classification systems
Educational stages
School systems
Statistics of education